Irvine is a master-planned city in southern Orange County, California, United States, in the Los Angeles metropolitan area. The Irvine Company started developing the area in the 1960s and the city was formally incorporated on December 28, 1971. The  city had a population of 307,670 at the 2020 census.

A number of corporations, particularly in the technology and semiconductor sectors, have their national or international headquarters in Irvine. Irvine is also home to several higher education institutions including the University of California, Irvine (UCI), Concordia University, Irvine Valley College, the Orange County Center of the University of Southern California (USC), and campuses of California State University Fullerton (CSUF), University of La Verne, and Pepperdine University.

History
The Gabrieleño indigenous group inhabited Irvine about 2,000 years ago. Gaspar de Portolà, a Spanish explorer, came to the area in 1769, which led to the establishment of forts, missions and cattle herds. The King of Spain parceled out land for missions and private use.

After Mexico's independence from Spain in 1821, the Mexican government secularized the missions and assumed control of the lands. It began distributing the land to Mexican citizens who applied for grants. Three large Spanish/Mexican grants made up the land that later became the Irvine Ranch: Rancho Santiago de Santa Ana, Rancho San Joaquin and Rancho Lomas de Santiago.

In 1864, Jose Andres Sepulveda, owner of Rancho San Joaquin, sold  to Benjamin and Thomas Flint, Llewellyn Bixby and James Irvine for $18,000 to resolve debts due to the Great Drought. In 1866, Irvine, Flint and Bixby acquired  Rancho Lomas de Santiago for $7,000. After the Mexican-American war the land of Rancho Santiago de Santa Ana fell prey to tangled titles. In 1868, the ranch was divided among three claimants as part of a lawsuit: Flint, Bixby and Irvine. The ranches were devoted to sheep grazing. However, in 1870, tenant farming was permitted.

In 1878, James Irvine acquired his partners' interests for $150,000 ($ in  dollars ). His  stretched  from the Pacific Ocean to the Santa Ana River. James Irvine died in 1886. The ranch was inherited by his son, James Irvine II, who incorporated it into the Irvine Company. James Irvine II shifted the ranch operations to field crops, olive and citrus crops.

In 1888, the Santa Fe Railroad extended its line to Fallbrook Junction, north of San Diego, and named a station along the way after James Irvine. The town that formed around this station was named Myford, after Irvine's son, because a post office in Calaveras County already bore the family name. The town was renamed Irvine in 1914.

By 1918,  of lima beans were grown on the Irvine Ranch. Two Marine Corps facilities, MCAS El Toro and MCAS Tustin, were built during World War II on ranch land sold to the government.

James Irvine II died in 1947 at the age of 80. His son, Myford, assumed the presidency of the Irvine Company. He began opening small sections of the Irvine Ranch to urban development.

The Irvine Ranch played host to the Boy Scouts of America's 1953 National Scout Jamboree. Jamboree Road, a major street which now stretches from Newport Beach to the city of Orange, was named in honor of this event. David Sills, then a young Boy Scout from Peoria, Illinois, was among the attendees at the 1953 Jamboree. Sills came back to Irvine as an adult and went on to serve four terms as the city's mayor.

Myford Irvine died in 1959. The Irvine Company sold the requested land for $1 and later the state purchased an additional .

William Pereira, the university's consulting architect, and the Irvine Company planners drew up master plans for a city of 50,000 people surrounding the new university. The plan called for industrial, residential and recreational areas, commercial centers and greenbelts. The new community was to be named Irvine; the old agricultural town of Irvine, where the railroad station and post office were located, was renamed East Irvine. The first phases of the villages of Turtle Rock, University Park, Westpark (then called Culverdale), El Camino Real, and Walnut were completed by 1970.

On December 28, 1971, the residents of these communities voted to incorporate a substantially larger city than the one envisioned by the Pereira plan.

In the 1970s, the mayor was Bill Vardoulis.

After the Fall of Saigon in 1975, a large influx of Vietnamese refugees settled in nearby Fountain Valley, especially in the late 1970s and throughout the 80s, forming a large percentage of Asian Americans in the city.

In late 2003, after a ten-year-long legal battle, Irvine annexed the former El Toro Marine Corps Air Station. This added  of land to the city and blocked an initiative championed by Newport Beach residents to replace John Wayne Airport with a new airport at El Toro.  Most of this land has become part of the Orange County Great Park.

Geography
Irvine borders Tustin to the north, Santa Ana to the northwest, Lake Forest to the east and southeast, Laguna Hills and Laguna Woods to the south, Costa Mesa to the west, and Newport Beach to the southwest. Irvine also shares a small border with Orange to the north on open lands by the SR 261.

San Diego Creek, which flows northwest into Upper Newport Bay, is the primary watercourse draining the city. Its largest tributary is Peters Canyon Wash. Most of Irvine is in a broad, flat valley between Loma Ridge in the north and San Joaquin Hills in the south. In the extreme northern and southern areas, however, are several hills, plateaus and canyons.

Planned city

Los Angeles architect William Pereira and Irvine Company employee Raymond Watson designed Irvine's layout beginning in the late 1950s, which is nominally divided into townships called "villages", separated by six-lane streets. Each township contains houses of similar design, along with commercial centers, religious institutions, and schools. Commercial districts are checker-boarded in a periphery around the central townships.

Pereira originally envisioned a circular plan with numerous artificial lakes and the university in the center. When the Irvine Company refused to relinquish valuable farmland in the flat central region of the ranch for this plan, the university site was moved to the base of the southern coastal hills. The design that ended up being used was based on the shape of a necklace (with the villages strung along two parallel main streets, which terminate at University of California, Irvine (UCI), the "pendant"). Residential areas are now bordered by two commercial districts, the Irvine Business Complex to the west (part of the South Coast Plaza–John Wayne Airport edge city) and Irvine Spectrum to the east. Traces of the original circular design are still visible in the layout of the UCI campus and the two artificial lakes at the center of Woodbridge, one of the central villages.

All streets have landscaping allowances. Rights-of-way for powerlines also serve as bicycle corridors, parks, and greenbelts to tie together ecological preserves. The city irrigates the greenery with reclaimed water.
The homeowners' associations which govern some village neighborhoods exercise varying degrees of control on the appearances of homes. In more restrictive areas, houses' roofing, paint colors, and landscaping are regulated. Older parts of the Village of Northwood that were developed beginning in the early 1970s independently of the Irvine Company, have the distinction of being a larger village that is not under the purview of a homeowners' association. As a result, homeowners in the older Northwood areas do not pay a monthly village association fee; its neighborhoods are generally not as uniform in appearance as those in other villages, such as Westpark and Woodbridge. However, the more tightly regulated villages generally offer more amenities, such as members-only swimming pools, tennis courts, and parks.

In addition to association dues, homeowners in villages developed in the 1980s and later may be levied a Mello-Roos special tax, which came about in the post-Proposition 13 era. For homeowners in these areas, the association dues coupled with the Mello-Roos special tax may add significantly to the cost of living in the city.

Villages
Each of the villages was initially planned to have a distinct architectural theme.

 El Camino Glen
 College Park
 The Colony
 Columbus Grove
 Cypress Village
 Deerfield (mixed styles)
 East Irvine
 El Camino Real (Spanish/Neo-Eclectic)
 Greentree
 Irvine Groves
 Harvard Square
 Heritage Fields
 Laguna Altura
 Lambert Ranch
 Northpark (French Country, Formal French, Italian Country, Formal Italian, Monterey and Spanish Colonial)
 Northpark Square (Spanish Mission)
 Northwood (Bungalow, Craftsman)
 Oak Creek (mixed styles)
 Old Towne Irvine
 Orangetree
 Orchard Hills (Rural Craftsman/Spanish/Tuscan)
 Park Lane
 Parkcrest
 Parkside
 Pavilion Park
 Portola Springs (Spanish/Tuscan)
 Planning Area 40 (Future Village)
 Quail Hill (Spanish/Tuscan)
 Racquet Club
 The Ranch
 Rancho San Joaquin (Shed style)
 Rosegate (Spanish/Tuscan)
 San Marino (Spanish/Tuscan)
 Stonegate (Spanish)
 Shady Canyon (Tuscan Ranch)
 Turtle Ridge (Tuscan)
 Turtle Rock (mixed styles)
 University Hills
 University Park (California Modern)
 University Town Center (mixed styles)
 Walnut (Prairie Style)
 West Irvine (California Modern)
 Westpark (Italian Riviera/Mediterranean)
 The Willows
 Windwood
 Woodbridge (Atlantic Coast)
 Woodbury (Tuscan/Spanish/French)
 Woodbury East (Spanish)

Business and commercial areas
 Irvine Business Complex
 Irvine Spectrum (Contemporary/Moroccan)
 Old Town Irvine

Climate
Late spring and early summer in Irvine is subject to the June Gloom phenomenon widespread in southern California, with overcast mornings and occasional drizzle.
Late summer and autumn are warm and mostly dry, with occasional bouts of humid weather extending from Pacific hurricanes off the west coast of Mexico.
Winters are mild, with most winters having no frost, and can be hot and dry when the Santa Ana winds blow. Irvine has a Mediterranean climate wherein precipitation occurs predominantly during the winter months. Because Irvine is close to the coast, different parts of Irvine have different microclimates; for instance, the June Gloom effect is stronger in the southern parts of Irvine, closer to the Pacific Ocean.

It can occasionally snow in the Santa Ana Mountains to the northeast of Irvine. Snow within the lower-lying parts of Irvine is very rare, but the area received three inches of snow in January 1949. A tornado touched down in Irvine in 1991, an event that happens in Orange County more generally approximately once every five years.

Demographics

In 2016, Irvine became the largest city in the continental United States with an Asian-American plurality. This was confirmed by the 2020 census, which showed that Asians constituted about 45% of the city's population.

2010
The 2010 United States Census reported that Irvine had a population of 212,375. The racial makeup of Irvine was 107,215 (50.5%) White, 3,718 (1.8%) African American, 355 (0.2%) Native American, 83,176 (39.2%) Asian, 334 (0.2%) Pacific Islander, 5,867 (2.8%) from other races, and 11,710 (5.5%) from two or more races. Hispanic or Latino of any race were 19,621 persons (9.2%). Non-Hispanic Whites were 45.1% of the population.

The census reported that 205,819 people (96.9% of the population) lived in households, 5,968 (2.8%) lived in non-institutionalized group quarters, and 588 (0.3%) were institutionalized.

There were 78,978 households, out of which 26,693 (33.8%) had children under the age of 18 living in them, 40,930 (51.8%) were opposite-sex married couples living together, 7,545 (9.6%) had a female householder with no husband present, 2,978 (3.8%) had a male householder with no wife present.  There were 3,218 (4.1%) unmarried opposite-sex partnerships, and 463 (0.6%) same-sex married couples or partnerships. 18,475 households (23.4%) were made up of individuals, and 4,146 (5.2%) had someone living alone who was 65 years of age or older. The average household size was 2.61. There were 51,453 families (65.1% of all households); the average family size was 3.13.

The age distribution of the population was as follows: 45,675 people (21.5%) under the age of 18, 30,384 people (14.3%) aged 18 to 24, 66,670 people (31.4%) aged 25 to 44, 51,185 people (24.1%) aged 45 to 64, and 18,461 people (8.7%) who were 65 years of age or older. The median age was 33.9 years. For every 100 females, there were 94.9 males. For every 100 females age 18 and over, there were 92.4 males.

The homeowner vacancy rate was 2.2%; the rental vacancy rate was 6.2%. 109,846 people (51.7% of the population) lived in owner-occupied housing units and 95,973 people (45.2%) lived in rental housing units.

During 2009–2013, Irvine had a median household income of $90,585, with 12.2% of the population living below the federal poverty line.

2000
The census of 2000 found there were 143,072 people, 51,199 households, and 34,354 families in the city. The population density was 3,098.0 inhabitants per square mile (1,196.2/km2), as of the census. The racial makeup of the city was 61.1% White, 7.4% of the population were Hispanic or Latino of any race, 1.5% Black or African American, 0.2% Native American, 29.8% Asian, 1.1% Pacific Islander, 2.5% from other races, and 4.8% from two or more races.

There were 51,199 households, out of which 36.0% had children under the age of 18 living with them, 53.8% were married couples living together, 9.8% had a female householder with no husband present, and 32.9% were non-families. 22.8% of all households were made up of individuals, and 5.0% had someone living alone who was 65 years of age or older. The average household size was 2.70 persons and the average family size was 3.17.

In the city, the population was spread out, with 23.5% under the age of 18, 14.4% from 18 to 24, 32.3% from 25 to 44, 22.6% from 45 to 64, and 7.2% who were 65 years of age or older. The median age was 33 years. For every 100 females, there were 93.8 males. For every 100 females age 18 and over, there were 90.0 males.

According to 2007 Census Bureau estimates, the median income for a household in the city was $98,923, and the median income for a family was $111,455; these numbers make Irvine the seventh richest city in the US, among cities with population 65,000 or higher. 9.1% of the population and 5.0% of families were below the poverty line. Of the total population, 6.1% of those under the age of 18 and 5.6% of those 65 and older were living below the poverty line.

In 2006, the median gross rent paid for housing was $1,660 a month. This was the highest of any place in the United States of more than 100,000 people.
The skyrocketing high cost of housing is a major issue in Irvine and Orange County, as the city council faces pressure to approve future income-subsidized housing projects to meet the demands of working-class citizens.

Economy

Irvine's tourism information is coordinated through the Destination Irvine program run by the Chamber of Commerce. The program provides information on Irvine as a place to vacation and as a destination for meetings, events and other business initiatives. Irvine has been rated one of the top cities for start-up businesses and its strong, fast-growing economy helped place Orange County as one of the top ten fastest growing job markets.

Irvine is also used as a location for film projects. The city government grants free or low-cost filming permits and offers location information to prospective productions.

Top employers

Business

The following companies are headquartered in Irvine:

 Allergan, Inc.
 Alteryx
 BAX Global
 Blizzard Entertainment
 Broadcom Corporation
 CalAmp
 CoreLogic
 CorVel Corporation
 Cylance
 eMachines
 Edwards Lifesciences
 Epicor Software Corporation
 Felt Bicycles
 Ford Motor Company (West Coast design center)
 Gateway, Inc.
 Golden State Foods
 HID
 Ingram Micro
 In-N-Out Burger
 K2 Network
 Karma Automotive
 Kelley Blue Book (subsidiary of Cox Automotive)
 Kofax
 LA Fitness
 Lifted Research Group
 Maruchan, Inc. (a division of Toyo Suisan)
 Meade Instruments
 Masimo
 MindFire, Inc
 NextGen Healthcare
 Obsidian Entertainment
 Paragon Software Group
 Pacific Premier Bank
 Point of View, Inc.
 Printronix
 Quicksilver Software
 Razer
 Ready at Dawn
 Red 5 Studios
 Red Digital Cinema Camera Company
 Rivian
 Ruby's Diner
 Skyworks Solutions
 St. John
 Stüssy
 Superformance, LLC
 Taco Bell (a division of Yum! Brands, Inc.)
 The Habit Burger Grill
 Tillys
 Ultimate Ears
 Vizio
 Western Mutual Insurance Group
 Wimberly Allison Tong & Goo (WATG)
 Xumo
 Yogurtland

The following international companies have their North American headquarters in Irvine:

 Asics
 Atlus
 Bandai Namco Entertainment (American division)
 Bandai Namco Holdings (American division)
 BenQ Corporation
 BSH Bosch und Siemens Hausgeräte GmbH
 Dahua Technology
 Fisher & Paykel Healthcare
 Hitachi Solutions
 Horiba
 Kia Motors
 KOG Games
 Marukome
 Mazda Motor Corporation
 Nikken Sekkei
 Samsung Electronics (IT and printing division)
 Sega (American division)
 Shimano
 Toshiba Corporation

Arts and culture

The Irvine Global Village Festival
Every October, Irvine hosts the Irvine Global Village Festival to celebrate the diversity among the citizens of Irvine and Orange County. The festival consists of exhibits from local merchants, entertainment from diverse cultures, and sampling of foods from various regions of the world. The event used to be held at Colonel Bill Barber Marine Corps Memorial Park but has since then been moved to the Orange County Great Park.

Irvine Community Television
The Irvine Community Television (ICTV) produces and broadcasts television programs on news, sports, arts, culture, safety for the Irvine community. The motto of ICTV is "For You, About You". ICTV airs on Cox Communications channel 30 and online.

Filming location
According to the Internet Movie Database (IMDb), the following productions were partially or entirely filmed in Irvine:

Libraries
Irvine has three public libraries: Heritage Park Regional Library, University Park Library, and Katie Wheeler Library. The Heritage Library serves as the regional reference library for Central Orange County and has a strong business and art focus while the University Park Library has 95,745 books, including a substantial Chinese collection.  Katie Wheeler was the granddaughter of James Irvine, and the library is a replica of the house owned by Irvine in which she grew up. Additionally, most UCI Libraries are open to the public.

Points of interest

 Ayn Rand Institute
 Boomers! (formerly Palace Park)
 California State University Fullerton, Irvine Campus
 Concordia University, Irvine
 Fashion Institute of Design and Merchandising, Orange County Campus
 Heritage Park
 Irvine Spectrum Center
 Irvine Valley College
 Islamic Center of Irvine
 Mariners Church
 Mason Park
 Northwood Gratitude and Honor Memorial
 Orange County Great Park
 Pao Fa Temple
 Saddleback Church, Irvine Campuses
 The Market Place
 University of California, Irvine
 University of California, Irvine, Arboretum

Sports
Irvine is home to USA Water Polo, the national governing body of the sport of water polo.

Irvine is home to Orange County SC ,  a professional soccer team who are members of the USL Championship division. The team plays it's home matches at Championship Soccer Stadium, located inside Great Park in Irvine.

The California United Strikers FC of the NISA are also based in Irvine and play their home matches at CSS.

Parks and recreation
Irvine has community parks and neighborhood parks. The community parks have public facilities located on each site. Neighborhood parks provide open space and some recreational amenities within the various villages of Irvine. Northwood Community Park in particular has recently made a unique addition: The Northwood Gratitude and Honor Memorial is the first memorial in the US ever built before the wars were over. It lists the U.S. military dead from Iraq and Afghanistan, and when dedicated on November 14, 2010, listed over 5,700 names (among the 8,000 available spaces). Also uncommon in the history of war monuments, it will be updated yearly.

Community parks

 Alton Athletic Park
 Colonel Bill Barber Marine Corps Memorial Park
 Deerfield Community Park
 Harvard Athletic Park
 Harvard Skatepark
 Heritage Park
 Hicks Canyon Park
 Jeffrey Open Space Trail
 Lakeview Senior Center
 Las Lomas Community Park
 David Sills Lower Peters Canyon Park
 Northwood Community Park
 Oak Creek Community Park
 Portola Springs Community Park
 Quail Hill Community Park
 Rancho Senior Center
 Turtle Rock Community Park
 University Community Park
 Windrow Community Park
 Mike Ward Community Park – Woodbridge
 Woodbury Community Park

Neighborhood parks

 Alderwood Park
 Blue Gum Park
 Brywood Park
 Canyon Park
 Carrotwood Park
 Chaparral Park
 Citrusglen Park
 College Park
 Comstock Park
 Coralwood Park
 Creekview Park
 Discovery Park
 Dovecreek Park
 Flagstone Park
 Hoeptner Park
 Homestead Park
 Knollcrest Park
 Lomas Valley Park
 Meadowood Park
 Orchard Park
 Orchard View Park
 Pepperwood Park
 Pinewood Park
 Plaza Park
 Presley Park
 Racquet Club Park
 Ranch Park
 Ridgeview Park
 San Carlo Park
 San Leandro Park
 San Marco Park
 Settler's Park
 Silkwood Park
 Silverado Park
 Sweet Shade Park
 Sycamore Park
 Tomato Springs Park
 Trailwood Park
 Tree Top Park
 Valencia Park
 Valley Oak Park
 Village Park
 Voyager Park
 Willows Park
 Woodside

Other public spaces within Irvine, not part of the city parks department, include William R. Mason Regional Park, Aldrich Park in the UC Irvine campus, and the San Joaquin Wildlife Sanctuary.

Government

Local government
Irvine is a charter city, operating under a Council/Manager form of government.

City Council
The City Council consists of the Mayor and four City Council members. The Mayor serves a two-year term and Council members serve four-year terms. The city has a two-term limit for elected officials. Elections are held every two years, on even-numbered years. During each election, two Council members and the Mayor's seat is up for consideration. The City Council appoints the City Manager, who functions as the chief administrator of the city. The City Council sets the policies for the city, and the City Manager is responsible for implementing the policies. The City Council appoints volunteers that serve on various advisory boards, commissions and committees.

According to the city's Comprehensive Annual Financial Report for FY2014–2015, as of June 30, 2015, the city has net assets of $2.59 billion. FY2014–15 revenues totaled $395.2 million, with property tax accounting for $50.7 million and sales tax accounting for $58.8 million. As of June 30, 2015, the city's governmental funds reported combined ending fund balances of $960.9 million.

City departments
The city of Irvine is served by eight departments. These departments are responsible for managing and performing all of the business of the City Hall and its services:

 City Manager
 City Clerk
 Administrative Services
 Community Development
 Community Services
 Public Safety
 Public Works
 Transportation

Services
Services provided by the city include:

 Animal control
 Building and safety regulation and inspection
 General administrative services
 Planning and zoning
 Public facility/capital improvement construction
 Recreation and cultural programs
 Refuse collection and recycling
 Street lighting
 Street maintenance
 Landscape maintenance and transportation management
 Redevelopment and Housing

Support services are provided through other agencies including: Irvine Unified School District, Tustin Unified School District, Southern California Edison, Irvine Ranch Water District, and Orange County Fire Authority.

State and federal

Politics
According to the Orange County Registrar of Voters, as of March 8, 2021, Irvine has 150,014 registered voters. Of those, 60,212 (40.14%) were registered Democrats, 37,510 (25.00%) were registered Republicans, and 45,913 (30.61%) have declined to state a political party/are independents.

Irvine voted for the Republican presidential candidate in every election from 1976 to 2004. In 2008, Irvine has voted for the Democratic candidate by a comfortable margin in each presidential election. In 2020, Democratic candidate Joe Biden won 64.3% of the vote in Irvine to Republican Donald Trump's 33.6%.

Education

Primary and secondary education 
Most of Irvine is located in the Irvine Unified School District (IUSD). The five high schools in IUSD are University High School, Irvine High School, Northwood High School, Woodbridge High School, and Portola High School. Arnold O. Beckman High School is located in Irvine but is administered by Tustin Unified School District. The five high schools in IUSD, as well as Beckman High School, have consistently placed in the upper range of Newsweek's list of the Top 1,300 U.S. Public High Schools. Crean Lutheran High School, a private Lutheran high school, and Tarbut V' Torah, which is a Jewish day school, are also located in Irvine. 

Irvine is also home to elementary and middle schools, including two alternative, year round, open enrollment K-8 schools, Plaza Vista and Vista Verde. Parts of the north and west of the city are within the Tustin Unified School District. A very small portion of the city, near Orange County Great Park, is located within the Saddleback Valley Unified School District.

Colleges and universities
Irvine is home to the University of California, Irvine, which is the second-newest campus (established 1965) in the UC system after University of California, Merced. Other higher education institutions in Irvine include California Southern University,  Concordia University, Westcliff University, Irvine Valley College, Fuller Theological Seminary, FIDM, The Fashion Institute of Design and Merchandising, Orange County Campus, Stanbridge University, and a satellite campus of California State University, Fullerton. Chapman University and Soka University of America are in nearby Orange and Aliso Viejo, respectively.

According to the 2000 United States Census, Irvine is ranked 7th nationwide, among cities with populations of at least 100,000, for having the highest percentage of people who are at least 25 years old with doctoral degrees, with 3,589 residents reporting such educational attainment.

Infrastructure

Transportation

Automotive
Streets and intersections owned by the city have trademark mahogany signage and are fiber optically linked to the city's Irvine Traffic Research and Control Center (ITRAC). Traffic cameras and ground sensors monitor the flow of traffic throughout the city and automatically adjust signal timing to line up traffic, allowing more vehicles to avoid red lights. Several major highways pass through Irvine (Interstate 5, and Interstate 405, California State Route 73, California State Route 133, California State Route 241, and California State Route 261). As a result of the signal timing, wide streets, and road layout, Irvine's side streets are capable of handling a higher volume of traffic than other cities in Orange County.

In 2015, 5.0 percent of Irvine households lacked a car; this percentage decreased to 4.0 percent in 2016. The national average was 8.7 percent in 2016. Irvine averaged 1.83 cars per household in 2016, compared to a national average of 1.8.

Mass transit and freight services

Bus and shuttle services
Local bus routes are operated by the Orange County Transportation Authority.

The city of Irvine has operated its own mass-transit bus service called the iShuttle since 2008. Four weekday commuter shuttles serve major employers, residential areas, shopping centers, and transportation facilities.  Two lines, Route A and Route B, connect the Tustin Metrolink Station to the Irvine Business Complex area. Route A provides service between the Tustin Metrolink Station and John Wayne Airport with stops along Von Karman Avenue. Route B heads along Jamboree Road before continuing through Main Street and Michelson Drive. The remaining two lines, Route C and Route D, offer connections between the Irvine Station and the Irvine Spectrum Area, which includes major employers, the Irvine Spectrum Center, and residential communities The Park and The Village. Route C follows Irvine Center Drive and ends at the Capital Group campus, while Route D serves the Irvine Spectrum Center, Kaiser Permanente – Irvine Medical Center, and Hoag Hospital Irvine.

Passenger rail
Irvine is served by commuter rail to Los Angeles, San Diego, Riverside, and San Bernardino counties at both the Irvine and Tustin stations of the Metrolink Orange County Line and the Inland Empire–Orange County Line. OCTA is currently implementing a major service increase on the Orange County line, with trains approximately every 30 minutes during weekday commuting hours. Amtrak trains run approximately every 60 to 90 minutes all days of the week along the Pacific Surfliner route between San Diego and Los Angeles. Amtrak trains stop only at Irvine station, unlike Metrolink, which stops at both Irvine and Tustin station.  Rail2Rail monthly passes allow commuters to use both Metrolink and Amtrak services, standard tickets are specific to a single operator. A four-story parking structure was recently completed at the Irvine station as part of a station renovation.

At one time Irvine intended to build a tram / guideway, but in February 2009 the city of Irvine canceled the project. Initially plans were underway to connect the Orange County Great Park to the Irvine Spectrum Center and surrounding businesses with a fixed-route transit system, also stopping at the Irvine Transportation Center (Irvine Station). In 2008, two possible routes were selected, but neither will be developed now. The entire $128 million in funding will be returned to the Measure M fund, and be available for other cities in Orange County.

Freight rail
A major contributing factor to the growth of Irvine was by freight rail provided by ATSF (now BNSF) Transportation. The Venta Spur was Irvine's first spur. Built in the 1920s, it moved citrus from three processing plants in what is now Northwood to the rest of the country. The processing plants were essentially Irvine's first and biggest employers of the time.

The plants started to go out of business in the 1970s and the spur was abandoned in 1985. In 1999, following its donation to the city of Irvine, it was turned into the Venta Spur bike trail.

The Irvine Industrial Spur is the second railroad spur in Irvine. It serves various industries in Irvine's Business Complex. It currently sees little to no movement and the Irvine planning department is considering turning it into a bike path.

Bikeways
Irvine offers a system of bicycle lanes and trails to encourage the use of bikes as a means of transportation.

Emergency services
Irvine contracts with the County of Orange for fire and medical services. Fire protection in Irvine is provided by the Orange County Fire Authority with ambulance service by Falk Ambulance. Law enforcement is provided by the Irvine Police Department (IPD). The IPD operates in a suburban city rated as having one of the lowest violent crime rates among cities with over 100,000 inhabitants by the FBI every year since 2005. The University of California Police Department also has jurisdiction – including arrest power – in areas of the city near the UC Irvine campus, while the California State University Police Department has similar jurisdiction in areas of the city near the CSU Fullerton Irvine campus. Irvine Valley College also maintains its own on campus police department.

Notable people

Sister cities

Irvine has four sister cities:

  Tsukuba, Ibaraki, Japan
  Taoyuan District, Taoyuan City, Taiwan
  Hermosillo, Sonora, Mexico
  Seocho-gu, Seoul, South Korea

References

External links

Archival collections
Guide to the East Irvine Historic Resources Documentation Photographs, 1988. Special Collections and Archives, The UC Irvine Libraries, Irvine, California.
Guide to the George Leidal Collection on the City of Irvine. Special Collections and Archives, The UC Irvine Libraries, Irvine, California.

Other
 

 
Cities in Orange County, California
Planned cities in the United States
Populated places established in 1971
Incorporated cities and towns in California
1971 establishments in California